FIFA Online 3 is a free-to-play massively multiplayer online football game which was announced on 13 August 2012 and entered the 1st closed beta on 20 September 2012 to 23 September of that same year in South Korea. On December 18, 2012, it was released in South Korea.

FIFA Online 3 shut down its services on June 30, 2020.

Development
FIFA Online 3 was originally developed for PC multi-player by Electronic Arts Seoul Studio based on the FIFA 11 engine. It has been launched through licensing agreements in South Korea (published by Nexon), Thailand (published by Garena), Indonesia (published by Garena), Vietnam (published by Garena), Singapore, Malaysia (published by Garena), and China (published by Tencent).

Each version's interface and commentaries have been localised into the local language.

On 25 July 2013 it was released into Open Beta in Thailand. FIFA Online 3 was released into open beta in Vietnam, on 11 September 2013. In Indonesia, it was released on 25 February 2014. In China it was released into open beta on 28 April 2014.

English Version

The Singapore and Malaysia version of FIFA Online 3 is the game's first available English version and is published by Garena Online. It was released on 10 October 2013. The game is accessible through the Garena Plus platform by changing the platform's region setting to Singapore/Malaysia.

FIFA Online 3 Mobile

On 29 May 2014, FO3 M was released in South Korea. It was released in Singapore and Malaysia on 3 May 2016. It is available on iOS and Android mobile phones.

Gameplay

In FIFA Online 3, players can choose to play and customize a team from any of over 30 leagues and 15,000 real world players. Players can either play single-player through a season, or play against other online players. Playing matches earns EP, which is the in-game currency used to buy players and items.

FIFA Online 3's gameplay was similar to FIFA 11 in the beginning, but has switched to Impact engine which is similar to FIFA 14 since 2015. The game added support for multiplayer online play. Players can play custom matches of up to 3 players a side. An online transfer market to buy or sell players, a club system and a premium (real world cash) item shop are also available.

FIFA Online 3 features several game modes that are similar to the ones that were in FIFA Online 2. League Mode has not been significantly changed, while the online modes have been slightly edited. Players can now play friendly games against players of similar skill (Quick 1vs1) or random players (VS Random), and can also play against their friends (VS Custom). Players also have the option to play as the manager by controlling the team's tactics and formation (VS Manager).

The FIFA Online 2 World Tour has been upgraded to a ranking system (Ranking Mode), where every player starts out with 1500 points and can play against players who have a similar number of points. Winning a match is rewarded with 10 points, with more points added/deducted on to each consecutive win/loss and the difference in the number of goals scored/conceded in each match. Rewards are given out at the end of every in-game season to all players based on their points.

FIFA Online 3 is playable using a keyboard using certain keys to play and arrows on the keyboard or a gamepad.

Reception
FIFA Online 3 is the second-most popular game in South Korea as of October 2013.

References 

2012 video games
Android (operating system) games
Online 3
FIFA Online
EA Sports games
IOS games
Massively multiplayer online games
Video games developed in South Korea
Windows games
Garena games